Pont de Molins is a municipality in the comarca of Alt Empordà, Girona, Catalonia, Spain. The ruins of the Monastery of Santa María del Roure are to the northwest.

References

External links
 Government data pages 

Municipalities in Alt Empordà
Populated places in Alt Empordà